Acheilognathus tabira tohokuensis is a subspecies of the ray-finned fish Acheilognathus tabira.

References

Acheilognathus